Leptocorisa is a genus of broad-headed bugs in the family Alydidae. There are about 17 described species in Leptocorisa, some of which are known as "rice bugs" or gundhi bugs (in India); they are found in south and east Asia and in Oceania.

Species
These 17 species belong to the genus Leptocorisa:

 Leptocorisa acuta (Thunberg, 1783)
 Leptocorisa ayamaruensis Van Doesburg & Siwi, 1983
 Leptocorisa biguttata Walker, 1871
 Leptocorisa bipunctata Costa, 1863
 Leptocorisa chinensis Dallas, 1852
 Leptocorisa costalis Herrich-Schäffer, 1846
 Leptocorisa discoidalis Walker, 1871
 Leptocorisa lepida Breddin, 1909
 Leptocorisa luzonensis Ahmad, 1965
 Leptocorisa luzonica Ahmad, 1965
 Leptocorisa oratoria (Fabricius, 1794)
 Leptocorisa palawanensis Ahmad, 1965
 Leptocorisa pseudolepida Ahmad, 1965
 Leptocorisa sakdapolrakae Ahmad, 1965
 Leptocorisa solomonensis Ahmad, 1965
 Leptocorisa tagalica Ahmad, 1965
 Leptocorisa timorensis Van Doesburg & Siwi, 1983

References

Further reading

 

Alydidae
Hemiptera of Asia